KNWC, known on-air as Faith 1270 KNWC, or by the network name Faith Radio, is a radio station in Sioux Falls, South Dakota, owned and operated by University of Northwestern – St Paul and is a non-profit, listener-supported radio station relying on donations from the local community throughout the year.  It broadcasts on 1270 AM, covering the Sioux Empire and surrounding areas in South Dakota.

Programming

Programming is nearly 100 percent satellite delivered and produced by Northwestern Media. The format is mainly Christian talk and teaching, with programs such as Turning Point with David Jeremiah; Focus on the Family; Family Life Today with Dennis Rainey; Insight for Living with Chuck Swindoll; Living on the Edge with Chip Ingram; In Touch with Dr. Charles Stanley; and others.

Translators

References

External links
Northwestern Media

FCC History Cards for KNWC

NWS
Sioux Falls, South Dakota
Radio stations established in 1948
1948 establishments in South Dakota
Northwestern Media